Marv Green (born in California) is an American country music songwriter. He is known for co-writing Lonestar's 1999 single "Amazed", which reached number 1 on both the Hot Country Songs and Billboard Hot 100 charts. This song won him a Song of the Year award from Broadcast Music, Inc. (BMI).

Discography

References

External links

American country singer-songwriters
Living people
Place of birth missing (living people)
Singer-songwriters from California
Country musicians from California
Year of birth missing (living people)
American male singer-songwriters